Zmajan is an uninhabited Croatian island in the Adriatic Sea located south-southwest of Vodice and west of Zlarin.

References

Islands of the Adriatic Sea
Islands of Croatia
Uninhabited islands of Croatia